The Southern African Foundation for the Conservation of Coastal Birds (SANCCOB) is an international body dedicated to seabird rehabilitation. The only seabird rehabilitation organisation registered with the South African Veterinary Council, the non-profit centre is based at the Rietvlei Wetland Reserve in Table View, South Africa.

SANCCOB conserves and protect South Africa's sea birds, especially threatened species, for the benefit of present and future generations.

The organization was founded in November 1968 in response to an increase in oiling of penguins on South African coasts, connected to higher tanker traffic following the closure of the Suez Canal after the Six-Day War. It admitted between 200 and 2,000 birds per year during 1969–1993, almost all of which were African penguins. Since 1983, SANCCOB has handled more than 35,000 oiled penguins. The vast majority of these penguins were oiled in the Apollo Sea spill (1994) and the Treasure spill (2000). As the latter event also necessitated the precautionary evacuation of 19,500 un-oiled birds, almost a quarter of the global population was handled at that time. From 1990 to 2005, an average of 750 oiled penguins have been admitted annually from oiling events other than these two spills. In total, SANCCOB has handled over 85,000 seabirds since its inception.

A modeling exercise by the University of Cape Town's Percy FitzPatrick Institute of African Ornithology found that rehabilitating oiled African penguins has resulted in the current population being 19 percent larger than it would have been in the absence of SANCCOB's rehabilitation efforts.

Activities 
 Rehabilitate ill, injured, oiled, and orphaned sea birds,
 Manage the rehabilitation of seabirds during major oil spills,
 Raise awareness about conservation through environmental education,
 Collaborate on research projects.

External links

References 

1968 establishments in South Africa
Environmental organisations based in South Africa
Organizations established in 1968
Bird conservation organizations
Seabirds
Wildlife rehabilitation
Animal welfare organisations based in South Africa